The following is a list of natural lakes of Austria with a surface area of more than  in alphabetical order.

List

See also
List of dams and reservoirs in Austria
Geography of Austria

References

Austria
Lakes